A hunt is the act of pursuing and capturing or killing wild animals.

Hunt or hunts may also refer to:

Arts and entertainment
 Hunt (painting), a 2002 painting by Neo Rauch
 Hunt (2022 film), a South Korean film
 Hunt (2023 film), an Indian Telugu-language action thriller film
 "Hunt", a song by Goldfrapp from the album Head First

Businesses
 Hunt Petroleum, an oil and gas company formed in 1950, now part of XTO Energy
 Hunt Oil Company, an independent oil and gas company headquartered in Dallas, Texas
 Hunt Refining Company, a refiner of asphalt
 Hunt's, a brand of tomato products
 J. B. Hunt, an American transportation and logistics company

People and fictional characters
 Hunt (surname), a list of people and fictional characters
 Hunt (given name), a list of people and fictional characters

Places and geographical features
 Hunt, Ohio, an unincorporated community in Ohio, USA
 Hunt, Texas, an unincorporated town in Texas, USA
 McFarland, California, a city in California, USA, formerly called Hunt
 Hunts Bay, a bay on the Gower Peninsula, Wales
 Hunts Creek, a creek in Greater Western Sydney, New South Wales, Australia
 Hunts Mesa, a mesa in Monument Valley, Arizona, USA
 Hunts Pond, a pond in Chenango County, New York State, USA
 Hunts Run, a creek in Sullivan County, Pennsylvania, USA
 Huntingdonshire, abbreviated Hunts, a non-metropolitan district of Cambridgeshire and a historic county of England

Ships
 Hunt-class (disambiguation), three British Royal Navy ship classes
 USS Hunt (DD-194), a Clemson-class destroyer commissioned in 1919
 USS Hunt (DD-674), a Fletcher-class destroyer commissioned in 1943

Other uses
 Hunt, a fox hunting club
 23041 Hunt, an asteroid

See also

 The Hunt (disambiguation)
 Hunt model, a mathematical description of human color vision
 Hunts Corners (disambiguation)
 Hunts Green (disambiguation)
 Hunts Point (disambiguation)
 Hunt Valley (disambiguation)
 
 
 
 
 Hunted (disambiguation)
 Hunter (disambiguation)
 Huntress (disambiguation)
 Hunting (disambiguation)
 Huntly (disambiguation)